The 2005 BMW Open was a men's Association of Tennis Professionals tennis tournament held in Munich, Germany. It was part of the 2005 ATP Tour and was classified as an International Series event. The tournament was played on outdoor clay courts and held from 25 April through 2 May 2005. First-seeded David Nalbandian won the singles title.

Finals

Singles

 David Nalbandian defeated  Andrei Pavel 6–4, 6–1
 It was Nalbandian's 1st title of the year and the 3rd of his career.

Doubles

 Mario Ančić /  Julian Knowle defeated  Florian Mayer /  Alexander Waske 6–3, 1–6, 6–3
 It was Ančić's 1st title of the year and the 2nd of his career. It was Knowle's 1st title of the year and the 5th of his career.

References

External links 
 Association of Tennis Professionals (ATP) tournament profile

 
BMW Open
Bavarian International Tennis Championships
April 2005 sports events in Europe
May 2005 sports events in Europe